Mes Rafsanjan Football Club is an Iranian football club based in Rafsanjan, Iran. The club is owned by the National Mes Company the nationalised Iranian copper industry after which the club is named (Persian: اصف romanized: mes).

History
In 1997 the national Iranian copper industry decided to form a football club in one of its focus cities, Rafsanjan. It would go on to form another football team in Kerman a year later, also named after the national copper industry.

Mes Rafsanjan knocked out a number of Persian Gulf Pro League clubs in the Hazfi Cup of 2008–09, including Foolad and Esteghlal. The club was later defeated by the eventual champions Zob Ahan in the semi-finals.

In 2020 Mes Refanjan were promoted to the Persian Gulf Pro League, where they have enjoyed moderate success.

Season-by-season
The table below shows the achievements of the club in various competitions.

Honours
Azadegan League
 Winners (1): 2019–20

Players

First-team squad

For recent transfers, see List of Iranian football transfers summer 2022''.

External links
  Official club website
  Players and Results

References

 
Football clubs in Iran
Sport in Kerman Province
Association football clubs established in 1997
1997 establishments in Iran